Dawn chorus may refer to:

 Dawn chorus (birds), when songbirds sing at the start of a new day
 Dawn chorus (electromagnetic), an electromagnetic wave phenomenon

Music 
 Dawn Chorus (Jacques Greene album), 2019
 Dawn Chorus (LKFFCT album), 2017
 "Dawn Chorus", a song by Boards of Canada from their album, Geogaddi
 "Dawn Chorus", a song by Modern English from their album After the Snow
 "Dawn Chorus", a song by Thom Yorke from his album Anima
 Dawn Chorus (Canon of the Three Stars), 1984 album by Isao Tomita
 Dawn Chorus, a 2017 album by Hidden Orchestra 
 Dawn Chorus and the Blue Tits, a band featuring Liz Kershaw and (briefly) Carol Vorderman